This is a list of settlements in the region of Attica, Greece.

Mainland Attica

 Acharnes
 Afidnes
 Agia Paraskevi
 Agia Varvara
 Agioi Anargyroi
 Agios Dimitrios
 Agios Ioannis Rentis
 Agios Konstantinos
 Agios Stefanos
 Aigaleo
 Alimos
 Amarousio
 Anavyssos
 Ano Liosia
 Anoixi
 Anthousa
 Argyroupoli
 Artemida
 Aspropyrgos
 Athens
 Avlonas
 Chaidari
 Chalandri
 Cholargos
 Dafni
 Dionysos
 Drapetsona
 Drosia
 Ekali
 Eleusis
 Elliniko
 Erythres
 Filothei
 Fyli
 Galatsi
 Gerakas
 Glyfada
 Glyka Nera
 Grammatiko
 Ilion
 Ilioupoli
 Irakleio
 Kaisariani
 Kalamos
 Kallithea
 Kalyvia Thorikou
 Kamatero
 Kapandriti
 Keratea
 Keratsini
 Kifisia
 Korydallos
 Kouvaras
 Kropia
 Kryoneri
 Lavreotiki
 Lykovrysi
 Magoula
 Malakasa
 Mandra
 Marathon
 Markopoulo Mesogaias
 Markopoulo Oropou
 Megara
 Melissia
 Metamorfosi
 Moschato
 Nea Chalkidona
 Nea Erythraia
 Nea Filadelfeia
 Nea Ionia
 Nea Makri
 Nea Palatia
 Nea Penteli
 Nea Peramos
 Nea Smyrni
 Neo Psychiko
 Nikaia
 Oinoi
 Oropos
 Paiania
 Palaia Fokaia
 Palaio Faliro
 Pallini
 Papagou
 Pefki
 Penteli
 Perama
 Peristeri
 Petroupoli
 Pikermi
 Piraeus
 Polydendri
 Psychiko
 Rafina
 Rodopoli
 Saronida
 Skala Oropou
 Spata-Loutsa
 Stamata
 Sykamino
 Tavros
 Thrakomakedones
 Vari
 Varnavas
 Vgethi
 Vilia
 Voula
 Vouliagmeni
 Vrilissia
 Vyronas
 Ymittos
 Zefyri
 Zografou

Islands and Troizinia

 Aegina
 Aianteio
 Ampelakia
 Agkistri
 Ano Fanari
 Antikythera
 Aroniadika
 Cythera
 Dryopi
 Fratsia
 Friligkianika
 Galatas
 Hydra
 Karatzas
 Karavas
 Karvounades
 Kontolianika
 Kounoupitsa
 Kypseli, Aegina
 Kypseli, Methana
 Livadi
 Logothetianika
 Megalochori
 Mesagros
 Methana
 Mitata
 Mylopotamos
 Myrtidia
 Perdika
 Poros
 Potamos
 Salamina (city) 
 Selinia
 Spetses
 Taktikoupoli
 Troizina 
 Vathy

See also
List of towns and villages in Greece

 
Attica